Hierodoris stellata is a species of moth in the family Plutellidae. It is endemic to New Zealand and is found in Fiordland and Dunedin. This species has been found in coastal native forest. Larvae feed on Astelia flower-spikes and adults are on the wing in late December and January. It has been stated that this species belongs to the genus Charixena however this placement has yet to be published. As such this species is currently known as Hierodoris (s.l.) stellata or Hierodoris' stellata.

 Taxonomy 
This species was first described by Alfred Philpott in 1918 using a specimen collected at  Blue Cliff in Te Waewae Bay, Fiordland by C.C. Fenwick in January. Fenwick captured this specimen in bush at night. Philpott named the species Hierodoris ? stellata as he was unsure of the genus and suspected it may belong to a previously unrecorded genus in New Zealand. In 1988 Dugdale placed this species within the family Plutellidae and this placement was agreed with by Robert Hoare in 2005. Hoare went on to communicate this species should be placed in the genus Charixena but that this had yet to be published.   As such this species is currently known as Hierodoris (s.l.) stellata or 'Hierodoris stellata. The male holotype specimen is held at Te Papa.

Description

Philpott described this species as follows:

Habitat and host
This species has been found in coastal native forest. Larvae feed on Astelia flower-spikes and adults are on the wing in December and January.

References 

Oecophoridae
Moths described in 1918
Moths of New Zealand
Endemic fauna of New Zealand
Taxa named by Alfred Philpott
Endemic moths of New Zealand